Giuseppe Lepori (2 June 1902 – 6 September 1968) was a Swiss politician.

He was elected to the Federal Council of Switzerland on 16 December 1954 and handed over office on 31 December 1959. He was affiliated to the Christian Democratic People's Party of Switzerland (CVP). 

During his time in office he held the Department of Posts and Railways.

External links 
 
 

1902 births
1968 deaths
People from Lugano District
Swiss Roman Catholics
Christian Democratic People's Party of Switzerland politicians
Members of the Federal Council (Switzerland)